Cyril Soyer (born 30 October 1978) is a French judoka.

Achievements

Video 
 Videos on Judovision.org

References

1978 births
Living people
French male judoka
21st-century French people